José Gola (February 7, 1904 – April 27, 1939 in Buenos Aires) was an Argentine film actor of the 1930s.

Born in La Plata, Buenos Aires Province, Argentina, Gola began acting for film in the 1934 film Mañana es domingo. He began appearing in popular films such as Puente Alsina (1935) and La muchachada de a bordo in 1936 and Mateo in 1937. In 1938 he appeared in the film  The Caranchos of Florida  in which he played a significant lead role. He died appear in 1939's Hermanos but his last film was Frente a la vida before he died suddenly of peritonitis.

He was one of the promising Argentine actors of the 1930s and would have arguably gone on to become one of the icons of the Cinema of Argentina.

He died on April 27, 1939 in Buenos Aires.

Filmography
Frente a la vida (1939)
Hermanos (1939)
 The Caranchos of Florida (1938)
La Estancia de gaucho Cruz (1938)
Nace un amor (1938)
La Vuelta al nido (1938) .... Enrique Núñez
El Pobre Pérez (1937)
Mateo (1937)
Fuera de la ley (1937) .... Juan Robles
Palermo (1937)
Puerto nuevo (1936)
La muchachada de a bordo (1936)
Puente Alsina (1935)
La barra mendocina(1935)
Por buen camino (1935)
Mañana es domingo (1934) .... Julio

External links
 

1904 births
1939 deaths
People from La Plata
Argentine male film actors
Deaths from peritonitis
20th-century Argentine male actors
Burials at La Plata Cemetery